The 1993–94 Rugby League Divisional Premiership  was the 8th end-of-season Rugby League Divisional Premiership competition.

With the league reduced to two divisions, the competition reverted to its original format and was contested by the top eight teams in the second Division. The winners were Keighley Cougars.

First round

Semi-finals

Final

See also
 1993–94 Rugby Football League season

Notes

References
 

Rugby League Divisional Premiership